The 2019–20 Ligat Nashim was the 22nd season of women's league football under the Israeli Football Association. 

The defending champions were ASA Tel Aviv University.

Teams and locations

Ligat al

League table

Liga leumit

Standings

References

Ligat Nashim seasons
1
women
Israel
Ligat Nashim